Beach volleyball was introduced at the Summer Olympic Games in the 1992 Games as a demonstration event, and has been an official Olympic sport since  1996. The United States is the only country to win medals in every edition.

Winning the Olympics is considered to be the highest honor in international beach volleyball, followed by the World Championships, and the World Tour of the International Volleyball Federation (FIVB) for men and women.

History

Origins 
Beach volleyball was a demonstration sport at the 1992 Summer Olympics in Barcelona, at which Sinjin Smith and Randy Stoklos won the men's tournament, and Karolyn Kirby and Nancy Reno won the women's.

Beach volleyball was introduced as an official Olympic sport in 1996. A total of 24 teams take part in each beach volleyball Olympic tournament. Teams qualify on the basis of their performance in FIVB (Fédération Internationale de Volleyball) events over the course of about 18 months before the Olympic Games. There is a limit of two teams per country, and one spot apiece is reserved for the host country and a randomly chosen wild-card country. In the event that any Olympic region is not represented, the highest ranked team from that continent qualifies for the tournament.

Men's beach volleyball 

The men's tournament has had a constant number of teams, with 24 couples in each edition.

In the first tournament, played in the 1996 Olympics, the matches were played at "Atlanta Beach" in Jonesboro, Georgia. The winners of the semifinals played for the gold and silver medals. The losers of the semifinal played for third and fourth places. The final was contested between the Americans Karch Kiraly and Kent Steffes versus Mike Dodd and Mike Whitmarsh. Kiraly is so far the only person with Olympic medals in both indoor and beach volleyball since he had won the gold medal indoors in the tournament of 1984 as well as 1988 in Seoul, South Korea.

The beach volleyball tournament of 2000 was played in Bondi Beach, a suburb of Sydney. The winners were again an American team, Blanton/Fonoimoana, defeating Brazilians Zé Marco/Ricardo (the former had competed in Atlanta) in the finals.

In the 2004 Summer Olympics the tournament was held in the Faliro Coastal Zone Olympic Complex, in Athens, Greece. The Brazilians Emanuel/Ricardo (the former being a veteran of two Olympics, and the latter a silver medalist in 2000) won the gold medal, defeating Bosma and Herrera of Spain.

The beach volleyball tournament of 2008 was carried out at the Beach Volleyball Ground, located in the Chaoyang Park in Beijing. In an upset, reigning champions Emanuel and Ricardo were defeated by their compatriots Márcio Araújo (who competed in Athens) and Fábio Luiz in the semifinal, having to settle for the bronze (where they beat two Brazilians competing for Georgia). The Brazilian victors were then defeated by Americans Rogers and Dalhausser in the final.

The 2012 tournament was played at the Horse Guards Parade in London. Emanuel Rego, now paired with Alison Cerutti, got his third straight medal, completing the three podium colors, by reaching the finals, where he lost to Germans Brink and Reckermann. Mārtiņš Pļaviņš and Jānis Šmēdiņš from Latvia got the bronze.

After 16 years, the 2016 tournament again was held in an actual beach, Copacabana Beach in Rio de Janeiro. Alison Cerutti, now partnered with Bruno Schmidt, returned to the finals, and won the gold beating Daniele Lupo and Paolo Nicolai of Italy in the finals. The Dutch Alexander Brouwer and Robert Meeuwsen completed the podium.

The 2020 Olympics, held in 2021 after a delay caused by the COVID-19 pandemic, had beach volleyball at Shiokaze Park. Norwegians Anders Mol and Christian Sørum won gold, beating in the final Russians Viacheslav Krasilnikov, who had finished 2016 in fourth place, and Oleg Stoyanovskiy. Brazil missed not only the finals but the podium as a whole for the first time since the inaugural tournament, both pairs eliminated by eventual fourth place team Mārtiņš Pļaviņš and Edgars Točs.

Women's beach volleyball 

In Atlanta, Georgia, in 1996, there were eighteen teams entered, and the championship match was played between two Brazilian teams: Jackie Silva and Sandra Pires versus Mônica Rodrigues and Adriana Samuel. The Australians Natalie Cook and Kerri Pottharst edged out the Americans for the bronze medal.

At the Sydney Olympics of 2000, the number of teams was increased to 24. One of the two Australian teams, Natalie Cook and Kerri Pottharst, won the gold medal over the Brazilians Adriana Behar and Shelda Bede, four years after winning the bronze medal in Atlanta. Another Brazilian team, featuring 1996 champion Sandra Pires and runner-up Adriana Samuel, edged out the Japanese for the bronze medal.

Behar and Bede of Brazil avenged the 2000 defeat by beating Natalie Cook (now partnered with Nicole Sanderson) in the 2004 semifinal to return to the final match, but they were defeated by Misty May-Treanor and Kerri Walsh of the United States. Both May-Treanor and Walsh were veterans of the Sydney Olympics, but Walsh had been part of the American indoor team. Another American team, Holly McPeak and Elaine Youngs (the former in her third tournament, having been fourth in Atlanta), defeated the Australian team for the bronze medal.

In 2008 in China, May-Treanor and Walsh (now going by her married name of Walsh Jennings) were victorious again by defeating the Chinese team of Tian Jia and Wang Jie in the finals. Another Chinese team won the bronze medal, edging out Brazil in fourth place, and thus sending the Brazilian women home without a medal for the first time in the tournament history.

In 2012 in England May-Treanor and Walsh Jennings won for the third consecutive Olympiad by defeating the other American team of April Ross and Jennifer Kessy in the championship game. Thus the United States finished with the gold and silver medals, with Brazil winning the bronze medal, edging out China in fourth place.

The 2016 tournament in Brazil had the country return to the beach volleyball final after 12 years, with Ágatha Bednarczuk and Bárbara Seixas winning the semifinal over defending champion Walsh Jennings and London silver medalist April Ross. However, they lost the gold medal to the Germans Laura Ludwig and Kira Walkenhorst, who had also defeated the Brazilians Talita Antunes (4th in 2008) and Larissa França (bronze in 2012) in the semifinals. Talita and Larissa also lost the bronze medal to the United States, making Walsh Jennings the only player to win four beach volleyball Olympic medals. The defeat also broke a streak where every tournament had one country winning medals with both their teams: Brazil in 1996 (gold and silver) and 2000 (silver and bronze), United States in 2004 (gold and bronze) and 2012 (gold and silver), and China in 2008 (silver and bronze). There were also four teams tied for fifth place: Australia, Canada, Russia, and Switzerland, and hence seven countries were represented in the top eight teams.

The 2020 tournament in Japan had April Ross, now partnered with Alix Klineman, winning the gold in her third try, beating in the finals Australians Taliqua Clancy and Mariafe Artacho del Solar. Joana Heidrich and Anouk Vergé-Dépré of Switzerland, who had played in separate doubles in Rio, got the bronze. Brazil for the first time missed the semifinals, with at most a pair eliminated in the quarterfinals by the Swiss.

While twelve countries won medals in the male tournament, only six have done so with women. The dominating nations are Brazil and the US. Americans have the most gold medals with four. The only countries outside the six medalists (Brazil, USA, Australia, China and Germany) to reach the semifinals were Japan in 2000 and Latvia in 2020.

Competition formula

1996
A double-elimination tournament was played for both men and women until a total of four teams qualified for the semifinals: the two finalist teams of the winners bracket and the two finalist teams of the elimination bracket. The men's field had 24 teams, and the women's field had 16.

Competitors were selected through a detailed Olympic qualification process which saw the participation of a total of 587 men's and women's athletes from 46 countries. Each country could qualify up to two teams - host country United States had two spots already guaranteed, with the doubles selected through Olympic Beach Trials held in Baltimore, Maryland.

2000
Following an expansion on the women's tournament, both competitions had 24 teams. The format became single elimination, preceded by a preliminary round to define the round of 16 teams - the twelve winners of the preliminary games automatically qualified, while the twelve defeated teams played two elimination rounds to get the remaining four spots.

The teams qualify by accumulating points in FIVB Olympic Qualification Tournaments, with one of the host nation having a guaranteed berth and another having the possibility of qualifying through the ranking.

2004
Following a FIVB change of rules in 2001, the scoring was changed from sets of 15 points in a superseded sideout system to sets of 21 points in a rally point system.

The format had the 24 competing teams were split equally into six pools of four. The top two teams from each pool and the four best third placed teams progressed through to a single-elimination tournament of sixteen teams.

The qualifying added a continental quota - in the event of an unrepresented continent, the top team from that continent earned a spot.

2008–2020
The six pools of four format was retained, but the qualifying for third-placed teams was changed. Of the six 3rd place teams, two were directly qualified to the playoffs. Of the four remaining third placed teams, another two teams get to the playoffs through winning a lucky loser (repechage) match.

Results summary

Men's tournament

Women's tournament

Participating nations

Men

Women

Medal table
Sources:

Total

Medal table, men

Medal table, women

See also

Volleyball at the Summer Olympics
List of Olympic venues in volleyball

References

External links 
Beach volleyball at the Official website of the FIVB
Beach volleyball at the Official website of the IOC

 
B
Sports at the Summer Olympics
Olympic Games